Paraliparis selti, the blue Atacama snailfish, is a species of deep water snailfish that is native to the south-east Pacific Ocean hadal zone 6,714 meters under water in the Atacama Trench (Peru–Chile Trench). P. selti is 83 millimeters in length total and 75.9 millimeters in standard length. its one of the 200 species of snailfish discovered in the southern hemisphere.

Description 
Paraliparis selti has low large blue eyes similar in appearance to shallow water snailfish species. The main pigmentation of Paraliparis selti is blue but turns a dusky color when preserved. The head lacks any head flaps or barbels. P. selti has a deep rounded snout with it becoming bluntly rounded apron preservation.

Morphology 
Paraliparis selti is distinct from other snailfish in the same area due to it having 65 vertebrae and 12 abdominal vertebrae which is more than many other snailfish species. P. selti also has a comparatively low number of pectoral fins only having 18.

Naming 
When P. selti was discovered in 2022, scientist named the new species Paraliparis selti with  "Paraliparis" being its genus and the species name, "selti" meaning blue in the Kunza language (an extinct language in northern Chile and Peru).

References 

Liparidae